Great Portland Street is a London Underground station near Regent's Park. Great Portland Street station is listed as a building of National Significance and lies in Travelcard Zone 1.

History

The station was part of the world's first underground railway, the Metropolitan Railway, which opened between "Bishop's Road" (now ) on the Hammersmith & City line and "Farringdon Street" (close to the present-day  station). It was opened on 10 January 1863 as "Portland Road", changed to its present name on 1 March 1917 but was renamed "Great Portland Street and Regents Park" in 1923 and then reverted to its present name in 1933.
The current structure was built in 1930 on a traffic island on the Marylebone Road at its intersection with Great Portland Street and Albany Street.  Its construction is a steel framed cream terracotta clad exterior, with the perimeter providing shops and originally a car showroom with office space over the station. Great Portland Street was at a major sales location for the motor industry.  It was designed by the Metropolitan Railway's architect C. W. Clark and was Grade II-listed in January 1987.

The station lies at the northern end of Great Portland Street – a main road which marks the border between Marylebone and Fitzrovia.

The local neighbourhood plan identified the gyratory around Great Portland Street Underground Station as one where public realm improvements and traffic calming should be made.

Services 
The station is served by the Metropolitan, Hammersmith & City and Circle lines, between Euston Square in the east and Baker Street to the west. All three lines share the same pair of tracks from Baker Street Junction to Aldgate Junction making this section of track one of the most intensely used on the London Underground network.

Circle line 

The typical service in trains per hour (tph) is:
 6 tph clockwise via Kings Cross St Pancras and Liverpool Street
 6 tph anti-clockwise to Hammersmith via Paddington

Hammersmith & City line 

The typical service in trains per hour (tph) is:
 6 tph eastbound to Barking
 6 tph westbound to Hammersmith via Paddington

Metropolitan line 

The typical off-peak service in trains per hour (tph) is:
 12 tph eastbound to Aldgate
 12 tph westbound via Baker Street:
 2 tph to Amersham
 2 tph to Chesham
 8 tph to Uxbridge
The typical peak time service in trains per hour (tph) is:
 14 tph eastbound to Aldgate
 14 tph westbound via Baker Street:
 2 tph to Amersham
 2 tph to Chesham
 4 tph to Watford
 6 tph to Uxbridge

Connections
London Buses routes 18, 27, 30, 88, 205 and 453 and night routes N18 and N205 serve the station.

Gallery

References

External links

Circle line (London Underground) stations
Hammersmith & City line stations
Metropolitan line stations
Tube stations in the City of Westminster
Former Metropolitan Railway stations
Railway stations in Great Britain opened in 1863
Great Portland Street
1863 establishments in England
Charles Walter Clark railway stations
Grade II listed railway stations
Grade II listed buildings in the City of Westminster